The 2023 McNeese Cowboys baseball team represents McNeese State University during the 2023 NCAA Division I baseball season. The Cowboys play their home games at Joe Miller Ballpark and are led by tenth–year head coach Justin Hill. They are members of the Southland Conference.

Preseason

Southland Conference Coaches Poll
The Southland Conference Coaches Poll was released on February 3, 2023. McNeese was picked to finish first in the Southland Conference with 118 votes and 7 first place votes.

Preseason All-Southland team
Five McNeese players were named to the conference preseason first team.  Three McNeese players were named to the conference preseason second team.

First Team
Edgar Alvarez (NICH, JR, 1st Base)
Brad Burckel  (MCNS, SR, 2nd Base)
Josh Leslie (MCNS, SR, 3rd Base)
Parker Coddou (NICH, JR, Shortstop)
Bo Willis (NWST, JR, Catcher)
Tre Jones (TAMUCC, JR, Designated Hitter)
Payton Harden (MCNS, SR, Outfielder)
Brendan Ryan (TAMUCC, SR, Outfielder)
Xane Washington (NICH, R-SR, Outfielder)
Zach Garcia  (TAMUCC, SO, Starting Pitcher)
Grant Rogers (MCNS, JR, Starting Pitcher)
Tyler Theriot (NICH, SR, Starting Pitcher)
Burrell Jones (MCNS, SR, Relief Pitcher)
Alec Carr (UIW, SR, Utility)

Second Team
Josh Blankenship (LU, SR, 1st Base)
Daunte Stuart (NWST, JR, 2nd Base)
Kasten Furr (NO, JR, 3rd Base)
Tyler Bischke (NO, JR, Shortstop)
Bryce Grizzaffi (SELA, SR, Catcher)
Kade Hunter (MCNS, SR, Designated Hitter)
Josh Caraway (TAMUCC, JR, Outfielder)
Braden Duhon (MCNS, JR, Outfielder)
Issac Williams (NO, JR, Outfielder)
Cal Carver  (NWST, SR, Starting Pitcher)
Tyler LeBlanc (NO, JR, Starting Pitcher)
Will Kinzeler (SELA, JR, Starting Pitcher)
Dalton Aspholm (SELA, SR, Relief Pitcher)
Tre’ Obregon III (MCNS, SR, Utility)

Schedule and results

Schedule Source:
*Rankings are based on the team's current ranking in the D1Baseball poll.
|}

References

McNeese State Cowboys
McNeese Cowboys baseball seasons
McNeese State Cowboys baseball